A list of films produced in Spain in 1989 (see 1989 in film).

1989

External links
 Spanish films of 1989 at the Internet Movie Database

1989
Spanish
Films